Marquez Cooper (born c. 2001) is an American football running back for the Kent State Golden Flashes. He grew up in Gaithersburg, Maryland, attended Quince Orchard High School, played for the football team, and rushed for 2,897 yards and 51 touchdowns in two seasons. He received a scholarship to play for Kent State and made his debut in the fall of 2000. As a sophomore in 2021, he rushed for 1,205 yards and 11 touchdowns. As a junior in 2022, he had his second consecutive 1,000-yard season. Against Ohio on October 1, he set career-highs with 40 carries and 240 rushing yards. Through games played on November 19, 2022, he totaled 1,186 yards and 11 touchdowns.

References

External links
 Kent State profile

Year of birth missing (living people)
Living people
American football running backs
Kent State Golden Flashes football players
People from Gaithersburg, Maryland
Players of American football from Maryland